Midwives are professionals trained to assist women in childbirth.

Midwives may also refer to:

 Midwives (magazine), the magazine of the Royal College of Midwives
 Midwives (novel), a novel by Chris Bohjalian
 Midwives (2001 film), an America television film based on the 1997 novel Midwives
 Midwives (2022 film), a Burmese documentary film

See also
 Call the Midwife (book), the first book in a trilogy by Jennifer Worth
 Call the Midwife, BBC television period drama based on Worth's trilogy